Khalilabad (also Romanized as Khalīlābād; also known as Khālehābād) is a village in Fuladlui Shomali Rural District, Hir District, Ardabil County, Ardabil Province, Iran. At the 2006 census, its population was 1,955, in 396 families.

References 

Towns and villages in Ardabil County